Vasylkivska is station on Kyiv Metro's Obolonsko–Teremkivska Line. It is named after the street which leads to Vasylkiv, south-west to capital Kyiv.  The station was opened on 15 December 2010.

History
The station was planned to open late 2008. This was later rescheduled to March 2009. It was again postponed to Independence Day August 2009. On 12 May 2010, it was announced the station was expected to open by the end of 2010. The first trial run of a train took place on 5 November.

References

Kyiv Metro stations
Railway stations opened in 2010
2010 establishments in Ukraine